There are National Motorcycle Museums in a number of countries. Some of the better known are:

National Motorcycle Museum (UK), Solihull, West Midlands, England.
National Motorcycle Museum (Anamosa, IA), Anamosa, Iowa, USA.
Sturgis Motorcycle Museum & Hall of Fame in Sturgis, South Dakota